Warka  is a town in east-central Poland, located on the left bank of the Pilica river  ( south of Warsaw), with 11,035 inhabitants (2004). It has been situated in Grójec County, in the Masovian Voivodeship, since 1999; previously it was in the Radom Voivodeship from 1975 to 1998.

Warka obtained its city charter in 1321. A village called Winiary, which today is part of Warka, is the countryside residence of Pulaskis family where General Casimir Pulaski spent his childhood and the birthplace of Colonel Piotr Wysocki (September 10, 1797). Warka is also known for its famous brewery (since 1478).

For the duration of the UEFA Euro 2012, Warka hosted the Croatia national football team.

Notable people
 Casimir Pulaski (1745–1779), nobleman, soldier and military commander 
 Piotr Wysocki (1797–1875), military commander
 Israel Yitzhak Kalish (1779–1848), hasidic rebbe
 Yaakov Aryeh Guterman (1792-1874), hasidic rebbe
 Adam Jarzębski (c. 1590– c. 1648), early Baroque Polish composer, violinist, poet, and writer

Gallery

References

External links

 Official town webpage
 The town of a hero of two nations
 Jewish Community in Warka on Virtual Shtetl
 

 
Warka
Grójec County
Masovia
Masovian Voivodeship (1526–1795)
Warsaw Governorate
Warsaw Voivodeship (1919–1939)